The ABS-CBN Philharmonic Orchestra is a Filipino radio orchestra based in Manila. It was founded in 2012 with financial support from ABS-CBN Corporation and First Philippine Holdings Corporation. It is composed of 40 instrumentalists. The orchestra's musical director and conductor is Gerard Salonga.

History 
The official debut of ABS-CBN Philharmonic Orchestra was on July 20, 2012 in a concert held at the Dolphy theater. The orchestra played some classical pieces and some musical scores of Filipino films. Its first major public debut was on the "Icons at the Arena" concert at the SM Mall of Asia Arena on July 16, 2012. The orchestra played some of the most recognized film scores of the American composer John Williams in its first solo concert, "The Magic of John Williams" on September 2, 2012 at the Meralco Theater. In 2013, due to public demand, the orchestra repeated their concert "The Magic of John Williams" on February 23 held also at the Meralco Theatre. The orchestra has played alongside Andrea Bocelli, Idina Menzel, Lea Salonga, Lisa Macuja, Ballet Philippines, Ballet Manila, Joanna Ampil, Jose Mari Chan, Ogie Alcasid, Martin Nievera, Pilita Corrales, Louie Ocampo, Ryan Cayabyab, Basil Valdez, Rey Valera, Christian Bautista, Janella Salvador, Jona, and Xian Lim among many others.

Film scores
ABS-CBN Philharmonic Orchestra has scored several films including Debosyon (2013), Ignacio de Loyola (2016), and Ang Larawan (2017). The orchestra also provided the musical score for the Agila: The EKsperience attraction of Enchanted Kingdom.

References

External links
 ABS-CBN Philharmonic Orchestra website

ABS-CBN Corporation
Filipino orchestras
Star Music artists
Radio and television orchestras
Musical groups established in 2012
2012 establishments in the Philippines
Assets owned by ABS-CBN Corporation